The Women's 58 kilograms event at the 2018 Asian Games took place on 23 August 2018 at the Jakarta International Expo Hall A.

Schedule
All times are Western Indonesia Time (UTC+07:00)

Records

Results

References

External links
Weightlifting at the 2018 Asian Games
Official Result Book Weightlifting at awfederation.com

Women's 58 kg
2018 in women's weightlifting